Şahnəzərli (also, Beyuk- Shakhnazarli, Bëyuk Shakhnazarli, and Shakh-Nazarly) is a village and municipality in the Davachi Rayon of Azerbaijan.  It has a population of 1,092.

References 

Populated places in Shabran District